The Billboard is a massive granite monolith in the Sarnoff Mountains of the Ford Ranges of Marie Byrd Land, West Antarctica, standing just west of Mount Rea between Arthur Glacier and Boyd Glacier. It was discovered in November 1934 by a Second Byrd Antarctic Expedition (1933–35) sledge party under Paul Siple, and is so named because of its form and appearance with vertical faces rising above the continental ice.

The summit was first visited by Bruce Luyendyk and Kuno Lecha by helicopter in January 1993 during expedition GANOVEX VII. In 1998–99, Christine Siddoway led a geological party from Colorado College that reached the summit by climbing a west route.

Geology
The Billboard is composed of Cretaceous Byrd Coast granite. The surface lacks glacial erosion features; however erratics found on the surface provide evidence of overriding by cold-based glacier ice. Features of prolonged surface weathering in a sub-aerial environment are sheeting and weathering pits.

References

Rock formations of Marie Byrd Land
Ford Ranges